Paru may refer to:
a village in Coșteiu, Romania
Paru, Iran, a village in Semnan Province, Iran
Paru, Fars, a village in Fars Province, Iran
A fried cow lung in Indonesian cuisine dish from Padang
Rita Jaima Paru, Papua New Guinean food entrepreneur
Paru Itagaki, Japanese manga artist
Paru River, a northern river in the Amazon rainforest